The 2015 UEFA European Under-17 Championship qualifying competition was a men's under-17 football competition played in 2014 and 2015 to determine the 15 teams joining Bulgaria, who qualified automatically as hosts, in the 2015 UEFA European Under-17 Championship final tournament. A total of 53 UEFA member national teams entered the qualifying competition.

Each match lasted 80 minutes, consisting of two halves of 40 minutes, with an interval of 15 minutes.

The final tournament also acted as the UEFA qualifier for the 2015 FIFA U-17 World Cup in Chile, with six teams qualifying (the four semi-finalists and the two winners of play-off matches between the losing quarter-finalists).

Format
The qualifying competition consisted of two rounds:
Qualifying round: Apart from Germany, which received a bye to the elite round as the team with the highest seeding coefficient, the remaining 52 teams were drawn into 13 groups of four teams. Each group was played in single round-robin format at one of the teams selected as hosts after the draw. The 13 group winners, the 13 runners-up, and the five third-placed teams with the best record against the first and second-placed teams in their group advanced to the elite round.
Elite round: The 32 teams were drawn into eight groups of four teams. Each group was played in single round-robin format at one of the teams selected as hosts after the draw. The eight group winners and the seven runners-up with the best record against the first and third-placed teams in their group qualified for the final tournament.

Tiebreakers
If two or more teams were equal on points on completion of a mini-tournament, the following tie-breaking criteria were applied, in the order given, to determine the rankings:
 Higher number of points obtained in the mini-tournament matches played among the teams in question;
 Superior goal difference resulting from the mini-tournament matches played among the teams in question;
 Higher number of goals scored in the mini-tournament matches played among the teams in question;
 If, after having applied criteria 1 to 3, teams still had an equal ranking, criteria 1 to 3 were reapplied exclusively to the mini-tournament matches between the teams in question to determine their final rankings. If this procedure did not lead to a decision, criteria 5 to 9 applied;
 Superior goal difference in all mini-tournament matches;
 Higher number of goals scored in all mini-tournament matches;
 If only two teams had the same number of points, and they were tied according to criteria 1 to 6 after having met in the last round of the mini-tournament, their rankings were determined by a penalty shoot-out (not used if more than two teams had the same number of points, or if their rankings were not relevant for qualification for the next stage).
 Lower disciplinary points total based only on yellow and red cards received in the mini-tournament matches (red card = 3 points, yellow card = 1 point, expulsion for two yellow cards in one match = 3 points);
 Drawing of lots.

To determine the five best third-placed teams from the qualifying round and the seven best runners-up from the elite round, the results against the teams in fourth place were discarded. The following criteria were applied:
 Higher number of points;
 Superior goal difference;
 Higher number of goals scored;
 Lower disciplinary points total based only on yellow and red cards received (red card = 3 points, yellow card = 1 point, expulsion for two yellow cards in one match = 3 points);
 Drawing of lots.

Qualifying round

Draw
The draw for the qualifying round was held at UEFA headquarters in Nyon, Switzerland on 28 November 2013 at 09:30 CET (UTC+1).

The teams were seeded according to their coefficient ranking, calculated based on the following:
2011 UEFA European Under-17 Championship final tournament and qualifying competition (qualifying round and elite round)
2012 UEFA European Under-17 Championship final tournament and qualifying competition (qualifying round and elite round)
2013 UEFA European Under-17 Championship final tournament and qualifying competition (qualifying round and elite round)

Each group contained two teams from Pot A and two teams from Pot B.

For political reasons, if Azerbaijan and Armenia (due to the disputed status of Nagorno-Karabakh), as well as Georgia and Russia (due to the disputed status of South Ossetia), were drawn in the same group, neither would host the mini-tournament. Moreover, Spain and Gibraltar could not be drawn in the same group due to the disputed status of Gibraltar.

Notes
Bulgaria (Coeff: 4.000) qualified automatically for the final tournament as hosts.

Groups
Times up to 25 October 2014 were CEST (UTC+2), thereafter times were CET (UTC+1).

Group 1

Group 2

Group 3

Group 4

Group 5

Group 6

Group 7

Group 8

Group 9

Group 10

Group 11

Group 12

Group 13

Ranking of third-placed teams
To determine the five best third-placed teams from the qualifying round which advanced to the elite round, only the results of the third-placed teams against the first and second-placed teams in their group were taken into account.

Elite round

Draw
The draw for the elite round was held at UEFA headquarters in Nyon, Switzerland on 3 December 2014 at 10:40 CET (UTC+1).

The teams were seeded according to their results in the qualifying round. Germany, which received a bye to the elite round, were automatically seeded into Pot A. Each group contained one team from Pot A, one team from Pot B, one team from Pot C, and one team from Pot D. Winners and runners-up from the same qualifying round group could not be drawn in the same group, but third-placed teams could be drawn in the same group as winners or runners-up from the same qualifying round group.

Before the draw UEFA confirmed that, for political reasons, Ukraine and Russia could not be drawn in the same group due to the Russian military intervention in Ukraine.

Groups
All times were CET (UTC+1).

Group 1

Group 2

Group 3

Group 4

Group 5

Group 6

Group 7

Group 8

Ranking of second-placed teams
To determine the seven best second-placed teams from the elite round which qualified for the final tournament, only the results of the second-placed teams against the first and third-placed teams in their group were taken into account.

Qualified teams
The following 16 teams qualified for the final tournament.

1 Bold indicates champion for that year. Italic indicates host for that year.

Top goalscorers
The following players scored four goals or more in the qualifying competition.

8 goals
 Jan Mlakar

7 goals
 Patrick Cutrone

5 goals

 Dennis Van Vaerenbergh
 Odsonne Édouard
 Kuki Zalazar

4 goals

 Layton Ndukwu
 Giorgi Arabidze
 José Gomes
 Trevor Clarke
 Florinel Coman

References

External links

Qualification
2015